Berrien Springs is a village in Berrien County in the U.S. state of Michigan. The population was 1,800 at the time of the 2010 census. The village is located within Oronoko Charter Township.

History

Berrien Springs, like Berrien County, is named for John M. Berrien; "Springs" was added after mineral springs were discovered in the area. The village is the site of the earliest settlement in Oronoko Township, and was first known as "Wolf's Prairie" in reference to the 1,000-acre prairie in which it was situated. The site had been a village under the leadership of a Potawatamie man named Wolf. The first permanent settlers, John Pike and his family, arrived in 1829. Francis B. Murdoch, later known for his work as a freedom suit lawyer, was a co-founder of the village and the first lawyer in the county.

The village of Berrien was platted in 1831, and the village of Berrien Springs was incorporated in 1863. Berrien Springs was the county seat from 1837 until 1894, when St. Joseph became county seat. The Berrien Springs post office opened with the name Berrien on December 4, 1832 and changed to Berrien Springs on April 18, 1836.

1839 Courthouse

When Berrien Springs became the county seat and its courthouse, designed by local architect Gilbert B. Avery, was completed in 1839. The Greek Revival-style courthouse emulated the architecture of ancient Greece with its large columns, triangular pediment and white paint. After the county seat was moved in 1894, the building was put to various uses and briefly was vacant. In 1967, efforts to preserve and restore the courthouse were started, before being completed by 1975.

The restored courthouse square contains Michigan's oldest courthouse as part of the Midwest's most complete surviving mid-nineteenth century county government complex. Today the square houses a county museum and archives and serves as headquarters for the Berrien County Historical Association. Its original buildings are listed on the National Register of Historic Places. The property is dedicated to the preservation of Berrien County's history and does this through permanent and temporary exhibits, programs, events, and community outreach.

Christmas Pickle Capital of the World
Berrien Springs was once known as the Christmas pickle capital of the world. A festival was established by the Berrien Springs-Eau Claire Chamber of Commerce and along with the Berrien County Historical Association and the village, which included parades, games, activities, and even a Pickle Prince and Princess contest. The event ran until the mid-2000s. In 2021, the Pickle Festival was revived by the Village, the BCHA, and the Berrien Springs Community Library.

Geography
The village is situated on the St. Joseph River.

Demographics

2010 census
As of the census of 2010, there were 1,800 people, 756 households, and 463 families living in the village. The racial makeup of the village was 72.7% White, 12.9% African American, 0.4% Native American, 5.1% Asian, 0.4% Pacific Islander, 3.8% from other races, and 4.7% from two or more races. Hispanic or Latino of any race were 12.9% of the population.

There were 756 households, of which 30.2% had children under the age of 18 living with them, 40.9% were married couples living together, 16.0% had a female householder with no husband present, 4.4% had a male householder with no wife present, and 38.8% were non-families. 32.0% of all households were made up of individuals, and 11.2% had someone living alone who was 65 years of age or older. The average household size was 2.35 and the average family size was 2.95.

The median age in the village was 34.6 years. 22.8% of residents were under the age of 18; 13.1% were between the ages of 18 and 24; 27.2% were from 25 to 44; 23.3% were from 45 to 64; and 13.7% were 65 years of age or older. The gender makeup of the village was 47.9% male and 52.1% female.

2000 census
As of the census of 2000, there were 1,862 people, 732 households, and 475 families living in the village. The racial makeup of the village was 77.12% White, 11.06% African American, 0.43% Native American, 4.03% Asian, 0.16% Pacific Islander, 4.30% from other races, and 2.90% from two or more races. Hispanic or Latino of any race were 8.92% of the population.

There were 732 households, out of which 30.2% had children under the age of 18 living with them, 49.2% were married couples living together, 11.6% had a female householder with no husband present, and 35.0% were non-families. 29.8% of all households were made up of individuals, and 10.7% had someone living alone who was 65 years of age or older. The average household size was 2.46 and the average family size was 3.05.

In the village, the population was spread out, with 23.0% under the age of 18, 11.9% from 18 to 24, 28.7% from 25 to 44, 21.0% from 45 to 64, and 15.3% who were 65 years of age or older. The median age was 36 years. For every 100 females, there were 95.0 males. For every 100 females age 18 and over, there were 88.1 males.

The median income for a household in the village was $32,396, and the median income for a family was $41,250. Males had a median income of $31,467 versus $21,750 for females. The per capita income for the village was $16,093. About 12.4% of families and 17.5% of the population were below the poverty line, including 25.4% of those under age 18 and 4.1% of those age 65 or over.

Schools

Elementary
Mars Elementary – Public, Grades K-2
Sylvester Elementary – Public, Grades 3–5
Berrien Springs Middle School – Public, Grades 6–8
Trinity Lutheran School – Private, Religious (Lutheran), Grades PreK – 8
Ruth Murdoch Elementary – Private, Religious (Seventh-day Adventist), Grades K-8
Village SDA Elementary – Private, Religious (Seventh-day Adventist), Grades K-8

Secondary
Andrews Academy – Private, Religious (Seventh-day Adventist), Grades 9–12
Berrien Springs High School – Public, Grades 9–12; team name: Shamrocks; team colors: green and white
 Blossomland Learning Center, run by Berrien County RESA - Preschool through 26 years of age

Post-secondary
Andrews University is located outside of town, but still in Oronoko Charter Township. It is serviced by the Berrien Springs post office.

Notable people

 Muhammad Ali, professional boxer, generally considered among the greatest heavyweights in the sport's history; owned a home in the Berrien Springs area.
 Regan Upshaw, defensive lineman for five NFL teams; born in Berrien Springs (1975)

References

Notes

Sources

1831 establishments in Michigan Territory
Populated places established in 1831
Villages in Berrien County, Michigan
Villages in Michigan